Amorphoscelis borneana is a species of praying mantis found in Borneo.

See also
List of mantis genera and species

References

Amorphoscelis
Insects described in 1913
Insects of Borneo